Halloween 73 is a live album by Frank Zappa, released in October 2019, consisting of recordings from the six Halloween shows in Chicago. It was released in a 4-CD boxed set and a different version of the album containing the highlights on a single CD.

Track listing 
Disc 1 (Show 1)
 Happy Halloween to Each and Every One of You 4:36
 Pygmy Twylyte 3:25
 The Idiot Bastard Son 2:24
 Cheepnis 3:28
 Another Assembly of Items 1:29
 The Eric Dolphy Memorial Barbecue 1:02
 Kung Fu 1:32
 Penguin In Bondage 7:12
 T'Mershi Duween 1:46
 The Dog Breath Variations 1:47
 Uncle Meat 2:24
 RDNZL 5:54
 Village of the Sun 4:14
 Ecidna's Arf (Of You) 4:11
 Don't You Ever Wash That Thing? 9:54
 Montana 6:55

Total: 62:12

Disc 2 (Show 1 Continued)
 Dupree's Paradise 19:12
 Almost Up to Date 1:35
 Dickie's Such an Asshole 10:04

(Show 2)
 That Greatest of American Holidays 4:50
 Cosmik Debris 6:51
 We're Hurtin' for Tunes 1:04
 Pygmy Twylyte 3:40
 The Idiot Bastard Son 2:17
 Cheepnis 4:18
 I'm The Slime 4:29
 Big Swifty 9:37

Total: 67:56

Disc 3 (Show 2 Continued)
 The History of the San Clemente Magnetic Deviation 1:50
 Dickie's Such an Asshole 9:59
 Another New Event :56
 Father O'Blivion – Part 1 9:03
 Father O'Blivion – Part 2 10:10
 Pervert's Special Holiday 1:10
 Penguin in Bondage 7:27
 T'Mershi Duween 1:45
 RDNZL 6:06
 Inca Roads 10:55
 Medley: Son of Mr. Green Genes/King Kong/Chunga's Revenge 16:23

Total: 75:44

Disc 4 (Bonus Rehearsals 10-20/21-73)
 The Eric Dolphy Memorial Barbecue (10-21-73) 1:05
 Penguin in Bondage (10-20-73) 6:45
 T'Mershi Duween (10-20-73) 1:46
 Dog Breath (10-20-73) 1:28
 The Dog Breath Variations (10-20-73) 1:20
 Uncle Meat (10-20-73) 2:18
 RDNZL (10-20-73) 5:10
 Magic Fingers (10-21-73) 4:47
 Inca Roads (10-20-73) 14:38
 Father O'Blivion (10-21-73) 17:54
 Cosmik Debris (10-20-73) 10:36
 Big Swifty (10-21-73) 4:41

Total: 72:28

Halloween 73 Highlights track listing 
 Happy Halloween to Each and Every One of You” (Show 1) 4:36
 Pygmy Twylyte (Show 2) 3:40
 The Idiot Bastard Son (Show 2) 2:17
 Cheepnis (Show 2) 3:18
 Another Assembly of Items (Show 1) 1:29
 The Eric Dolphy Memorial Barbecue (Show 1) 1:02
 Kung Fu (Show 1) 1:32
 Penguin in Bondage (Show 1) 7:12
 T'Mershi Duween (Show 1) 1:46
 The Dog Breath Variations (Show 1) 1:47
 Uncle Meat (Show 1) 2:24
 RDNZL (Show 1) 5:50
 I'm the Slime (Show 2) 4:29
 Big Swifty (Show 2) 9:25
 The History of the San Clemente Magnetic Deviation (Show 2) 1:48
 Dickie's Such an Asshole (Show 2) 10:24

Total: 63:02

Personnel 
Musicians

Frank Zappa: guitar, vocals
George Duke: keyboards, vocals
Napoleon Murphy Brock: vocals, tenor sax, flute
Tom Fowler: bass
Ruth Komanoff/Underwood: percussion
Bruce Fowler: trombone
Ralph Humphrey: drums, cowbells
Chester Thompson: drums

References 

Frank Zappa live albums
Live albums published posthumously
2019 live albums